Luca Giustolisi (born 13 March 1970) is an Italian former water polo player who competed in the 1996 Summer Olympics.

See also
 List of Olympic medalists in water polo (men)

References

External links
 

1970 births
Living people
Italian male water polo players
Olympic water polo players of Italy
Water polo players at the 1996 Summer Olympics
Olympic bronze medalists for Italy
Olympic medalists in water polo
Medalists at the 1996 Summer Olympics
Universiade medalists in water polo
Universiade bronze medalists for Italy
Sportspeople from Trieste